Ex opere operato is a Latin phrase meaning "from the work performed" and, in reference to sacraments, signifies that they derive their efficacy, not from the minister or recipient (which would mean that they derive it ex opere operantis, meaning "from the agent's activity"), but from the sacrament considered independently of the merits of the minister or the recipient. According to the ex opere operato interpretation of the sacraments, any positive effect comes not from their worthiness or faith but from the sacrament as an instrument of God.

"Affirming the ex opere operato efficacy means being sure of God's sovereign and gratuitous intervention in the sacraments." For example, in confirmation the Holy Spirit is bestowed not through the attitude of the bishop and of the person being confirmed but freely by God through the instrumentality of the sacrament. In order to receive sacraments fruitfully, it is believed necessary for the recipient to have faith.

Antiquity

In Antiquity, the idea led to a schism among the Donatist Christians. The Donatists held that "one of the three bishops who had consecrated Caecilian was a traditor", and therefore Caecilian's consecration was invalid. Furthermore, they held "that the validity of such an act depended on the worthiness of the bishop performing it" and Caecilian and his followers "responded that the validity of the sacraments and of other such acts cannot be made to depend on the worthiness of the one administering them, for in that case all Christians would be in constant doubt regarding the validity of their own baptism or of the Communion of which they had partaken."

In the Roman Catholic Church

According to the teaching of the Roman Catholic Church, to receive the fruits of the sacraments requires that a person be properly disposed. This means the efficacy of grace via the sacraments is not automatic. There must be, at least in the case of an adult, an openness to use the sufficient grace which is available in a sacrament. When the recipient is properly disposed, "the sacraments are instrumental causes of grace."

Sacramentals 
The teaching of the Roman Catholic Church regarding the sacramentals is that their efficacy comes ex opere operantis Ecclesiae (i.e., from what the doer, the Church, does), not ex opere operato (from what is done): i.e., as the Second Vatican Council said, "they signify effects, particularly of a spiritual kind, which are obtained through the Church's intercession". They "do not confer the grace of the Holy Spirit in the way that the sacraments do, but by the church's prayer they prepare us to receive grace and dispose us to cooperate with it". Sacramentals dispose the soul to receive grace and may remit venial sins when used prayerfully.

In the Anglican Communion
In the Anglican Communion, the principle of ex opere operato is made conditional upon worthy reception. Article XXVI of the Thirty-Nine Articles (Of the unworthiness of ministers which hinders not the effect of the Sacrament) states that the ministration of the Word (scripture) and sacraments is not done in the name of the priest or minister and that the efficacy of Christ's sacraments is not taken away, nor God’s grace diminished by the sinfulness of clergy. This is because sacraments have their efficacy due to Christ’s promise to his church.

See also

 Augustine of Hippo
 List of Latin phrases

 Conditional sacrament

References

Further reading 

 

Latin religious words and phrases
Catholic theology and doctrine
Anglican sacraments